Manasse Herbst (1 November 1913 in Galicia, Austria-Hungary –  3 January 1997 in Hallandale, Florida) was a German-speaking silent movie actor, child-actor, theater actor and singer. He participated in 416 sold-out performances of the operetta White Horse Inn between 1930 and 1932 in Berlin. During the first half of the 1930s, Herbst had a relationship with the German Baron Gottfried von Cramm, one of the more popular tennis players of the time. Because of this, von Cramm was sentenced in a Nazi propaganda trial that was recognized all over the world. Due to his Jewish background and the Nazi prohibition to perform his job, Herbst fled from Germany in 1936. Later, he became a U.S. citizen.

Life 
In 1920, Herbst participated in the silent movie Papa Haydn, where he performed as the young son of the composer Joseph Haydn. In 1926 he acted a part in the silent movie "The Son of Hannibal". Between 1930 and 1932, he performed 416 times within 18 months in the always sold-out operetta Im weissen Rössl (White Horse Inn) in the so-called "Theater of the 5,000", the Großes Schauspielhaus of Berlin, near Schiffbauerdamm. It was described as a cultural highlight in the Weimar Republic, which antagonised the Nazis who prohibited it as degenerate art (in German: Entartete Kunst) as soon as they came to power in 1933.

In 1931, 17-year-old Manasse Herbst met the married 21-year-old Gottfried von Cramm in the Berlin nightclub Eldorado when the latter was at the beginning of his career as a tennis champion. They were close friends until Herbst's forced emigration. It was sponsored by von Cramm, which was highly illegal at that time. Herbst and von Cramm tried to stay in contact, which was hard due to the Gestapo and World War II.

Manasse Herbst went to Lisbon, Portugal, where he could not find work since he had no knowledge of Portuguese. In 1937 he managed to travel to Paris, France, where he was able to live with his brother. From there, he contacted von Cramm who received the letter in Australia, where he was participating in a tennis competition. Gottfried von Cramm hoped to meet Herbst in 1938 when he was scheduled to travel to Paris to take part in the French Championships; this did not happen.

In April 1937, von Cramm was interrogated by Gestapo about his intimate relationship with Herbst. A rent boy had denounced him and others from hearsay of Berlin's gay scene, some falsely. For the Nazis, the denunciation of von Cramm was just a minor offshoot of the bigger Blomberg-Fritsch Affair. In an effort to minimise his sentence, von Cramm tried to reduce the duration of his liaison with Herbst to the time before the aggravation of the anti-gay laws that took place in 1935. In an exculpatory statement, he claimed to be blackmailed by Herbst in order to avoid a harsh sentence for a breach of exchange control regulations. Gottfried von Cramm was sentenced to one year in jail but came out on probation after seven months. His mother had intervened and met Hermann Göring, who was a member of the Rot-Weiss Tennis Club where von Cramm originated.

After World War II, Herbst, meanwhile married, visited Germany to thank von Cramm for saving his life. Herbst later lived in Hallandale, Florida, where he died at the age of 83.

Silent movies 
 1920: Papa Haydn (Director Karl Frey) as young son of composer Joseph Haydn
 1926: [[The Son of Hannibal (1926 film)|The Son of Hannibal]] (Director Felix Basch), starring Liane Haid, Alfons Fryland, Ferdinand von Alten, Siegfried Arno, Alexander Murski, Bruno Arno, Nikolai Malikoff

 Theater 
 1930–1932: The White Horse Inn (Director Erik Charell), as Piccolo, next to Paul Hörbiger, Willi Schaeffers, Siegfried Arno, Max Hansen, Walter Jankuhn, Camilla Spira, Otto Wallburg.

 Literature 
 Marshall Jon Fisher: Ich spiele um mein Leben. Gottfried von Cramm und das beste Tennis-Match aller Zeiten. Osburg 1990, .
 Andreas Pretzel: NS-Opfer unter Vorbehalt: Homosexuelle Männer in Berlin nach 1945. LIT, Münster 2002, .
 Marshall Jon Fisher: A Terrible Splendor – Three Extraordinary Men, a World Poised for War, and the Greatest Tennis Match Ever Played. Crown/Archetype 2009. 
 Clinton Elliott: The Intimate Lives of Gay Men Past and Present. Author House 2014. 
 Elizabeth Wilson: Love Game – A History of Tennis, from Victorian Pastime to Global Phenomenon.'' Serpent’s Tail 2014.

References

External links

1913 births
1997 deaths
German expatriate male actors in the United States
German gay actors
German male stage actors
German male film actors
German male silent film actors
Jewish emigrants from Nazi Germany to the United States
Male actors from Berlin
20th-century German male actors
People from Hallandale Beach, Florida
20th-century LGBT people